Zeerust is a commercial town situated in Ngaka Modiri Molema district North West Province, South Africa. It lies in the Marico valley, approximately 240 kilometres northwest of Johannesburg. It lies on the N4, the main road link between South Africa and Botswana. There are large cattle ranches in the area, as well as wheat, maize, tobacco and citrus fruit farms. There are also fluorite and chromite mines in the vicinity. Tourism is also a developing industry.

History
The original name of the farm on which the town was established was Sefatlhane / Sebatlani (meaning dusty place) belonging to Casper Hendrik Coetzee who bought it in 1858. The farm was later renamed Hazenjacht, and after that Hazia / Hazeah. 

Casper Coetzee contracted Walter Seymore to build a church and a fort on this farm, but Casper died before this was completed. In 1866, the farm then came into the hands of his cousin / Brother-in-law Diederik Jacobus Coetzee, who saw the potential of developing a town on the farm. He measured out some erven with the idea of starting a town, using "Ox riems" to measure out the plots instead of the accepted surveyors chains.

On 20 March 1867, the first erven of the newly established Coetzee-Rust were sold per public auction in Potchefstroom, before official recognition of the request to start a town was granted. The village gained official recognition in 1868, and later gained a landdrost (magistrate) in November 1871.

The name Coetzee's Rust was later abbreviated to Zeerust. Municipal status was obtained on 18 March 1936. Zeerust however wasn't the first town in this area. That honour belongs to Jacobsdal, a small village about 10 km south of Zeerust situated on the farm Vergenoegd, near the Lucerne station. The popularity of Zeerust as trading centre, caused the demise of Jacobsdal, and now it does not exist as a town anymore.

People of Zeerust
The main languages of Zeerust are Tswana and Afrikaans. The Batswana (Tswana people) call the town Sefatlhane. After the democratic dispensation in 1994, the name of the municipality- Zeerust was changed to Ramotshere Moiloa, after a mid-20th century chief of the Bahurutshe boo Moiloa who was also a political opponent of the Apartheid state. 

The town is a commercial hub for most of the villages situated in the Lehurutshe area, a few of which include; Lekgophung, Supingstad, Moshana, Matlhase, Rietpan, Motswedi, Dinokana, Lekubu, Mosweu, Ntsweletsoku, Mokgola, Borakalalo, Gopane and Nyetse.

Natural features
Two rivers flow through Zeerust, the Klein-Marico and the Karee spruit. Irrigation farming just outside the town relies on these water bodies.

Development

Olienhout Park
In Zeerust there is also a small suburb named Olienhout Park, which is commonly known as Sandvlakte, with a population of about 250 residents, a shop, a bar, Lutheran church and a school. There is a township nearby named Ikageleng with about 1000 people.

Shopping
A mall exists and a new mall is under development.

Mining 
The Zeerust Chromium Mine was first developed in 1942. Today this mine is a surface and underground operation, consisting of four distinct surface and underground workings extending 750 hectares. The ore mined is composed of chromite and magnetite.

Access to Madikwe Game Reserve
Madikwe Game Reserve can be accessed through Zeerust about 90 kilometres north of the town.

Access to Botswana
Botswana can be accessed through Zeerust at the Tlokweng Border Control Post, a further 106 km northwest.

References and external links
 Pieter de Jager(2001). "Die Korannafonteiners"
tourismnorthwest.co.za for general information about Zeerust.

Notes

Populated places in the Ramotshere Moiloa Local Municipality
Populated places established in 1867